Kozmice  is a municipality and village in Opava District in the Moravian-Silesian Region of the Czech Republic. It has about 1,900 inhabitants. It is part of the historic Hlučín Region.

History
The first written mention of Kozmice is from 1349. On 1 July 1973 Kozmice became part of the town of Hlučín, but the municipality once again became independent on 1 January 1993.

References

External links

Kozmice
Hlučín Region